Richard Norris Williams defeated Maurice McLoughlin 6–3, 8–6, 10–8 in the final to win the men's singles tennis title at the 1914 U.S. National Championships.The event was held at the Newport Casino in Newport, R.I. in the United States.

Final eight

References

External links
 1914 U.S. National Championships on ITFtennis.com, the source for this draw

Men's singles
1914